Ancient UNIX is any early release of the Unix code base prior to Unix System III, particularly the Research Unix releases prior to and including Version 7 (the base for UNIX/32V as well as later developments of AT&T Unix).

After the publication of the Lions' book, work was undertaken to release earlier versions of the codebase. SCO first released the code under a limited educational license.

Later, in January 2002, Caldera International (now SCO Group) relicensed (but has not made available) several versions under the four-clause BSD license, namely:
Research Unix: (early versions only)
 Version 1 Unix
 Version 2 Unix
 Version 3 Unix
 Version 4 Unix
 Version 5 Unix
 Version 6 Unix
 Version 7 Unix
 UNIX/32V
, there has been no widespread use of the code, but it can be used on emulator systems, and Version 5 Unix runs on the Nintendo Game Boy Advance using the SIMH PDP-11 emulator. Version 6 Unix provides the basis for the MIT xv6 teaching system, which is an update of that version to ANSI C and the x86 or RISC-V platform.

The BSD vi text editor is based on code from the ed line editor in those early Unixes. Therefore, "traditional" vi could not be distributed freely, and various work-alikes (such as nvi) were created. Now that the original code is no longer encumbered, the "traditional" vi has been adapted for modern Unix-like operating systems.

SCO Group, Inc. was previously called Caldera International. As a result of the SCO Group, Inc. v. Novell, Inc. case, Novell, Inc. was found to not have transferred the copyrights of UNIX to SCO Group, Inc. Concerns have been raised regarding the validity of the Caldera license.

The Unix Heritage Society

First edition Unix was restored to a usable state by a restoration team from the Unix Heritage Society in 2008. The restoration process started with paper listings of the source code which were in Unix PDP-11 assembly language.

References

External links
The Unix Heritage Society (TUHS), a website dedicated to the preservation and maintenance of historical UNIX systems
code, disk images, and related at TUHS
Unix First Edition Manual Pages
Restoration of 1st Edition UNIX kernel sources from Bell Laboratories

Bell Labs Unices
Discontinued operating systems